The Mount Fuji Doomjazz Corporation was a side project of the members of The Kilimanjaro Darkjazz Ensemble founded in Utrecht in 2007.

History

The idea for this project was born when the musicians of The Kilimanjaro Darkjazz Ensemble wanted to dedicate themselves completely to improvised music with a side project. Initially, there was no intention to release any records. However, early performances of the group were already documented, so that a performance on February 24, 2007 at the Amsterdam Overtoom 301 in June of the same year was released as the first album Doomjazz Future Corpses! via Ad Noiseam.

In the following years the group performed internationally and documented various performances as further publications in different formations. Jason Koehnen and Gideon Kiers appeared as the smallest unit, and, in addition to the musicians of the Kilimanjaro Darkjazz Ensemble, other guest musicians were added to performances. The loose collectivist form of the group influenced the music in each new line-up as much as the locations, the audience and the personal mood of the musicians.

The project disbanded in 2014.

Discography
Live albums
 Doomjazz Future Corpses! (2007, Ad Noiseam, Denovali Records)
 Succubus (2009, Ad Noiseam, Denovali Records)
 Anthropomorphic (2011, Denovali Records)
 Егор (2012, Ad Noiseam, Denovali Records)
 Live at Roadburn (2012, Roadburn)

In 2017 Denovali Records started re-releasing the complete back catalogue of the band.

References 

Musical groups from Utrecht (city)
Denovali Records artists